Statistics of Football League First Division in the 1976–77 season.

Overview
Liverpool retained their league championship trophy and won their first European Cup to confirm Bob Paisley as a successful replacement for Bill Shankly in his third season at the helm. Tottenham Hotspur and Stoke City's long spells in the First Division came to an end with relegation. Stoke sacked their manager Tony Waddington. On the last day of the season, Coventry City and Bristol City played out a controversial 2–2 draw, with play virtually stopping when it was heard that Sunderland had lost to Everton.  Both clubs survived while Sunderland were relegated.

After Manchester United manager Tommy Docherty had admitted his affair with the wife of the club's physiotherapist, the club's directors decided that he had broken their moral code and he was sacked.

League standings

Stats
Record
Most wins: Liverpool (23)
Fewest losses: Manchester City (7)
Most goals scored: Aston Villa (76)
Fewest goals conceded: Liverpool (33)
Best goal difference ratio: Liverpool (+29)
Most draws: Derby County (19)
Fewest draws: Aston Villa (7)
Most losses: Tottenham Hotspur
Fewest wins: Derby County (9)
Fewest goals scored: Stoke City (28)
Most goals conceded: Tottenham Hotspur (72)
Worst goal difference ratio: Tottenham Hotspur (–24)

Results

Managerial changes

Team locations

References

RSSSF

Football League First Division seasons
Eng
1976–77 Football League
1976–77 in English football leagues

lt:Anglijos futbolo varžybos 1976–1977 m.
hu:1976–1977-es angol labdarúgó-bajnokság (első osztály)
ru:Футбольная лига Англии 1976-1977